Belkacem Brahimi (born 20 January 1994) is an Algerian footballer who plays for ES Sétif in the Algerian Ligue Professionnelle 1.

Career 
In 2019, he signed a contract with MC Alger.

References

External links
 

1994 births
Living people
Amal Bou Saâda players
NA Hussein Dey players
Algerian footballers
MC Alger players
Association football defenders
21st-century Algerian people